Naser Pourmehdi (born 1959, Isfahan, Iran) is an Iranian retired football player and current coach.

Early life
He was born in 1959 in Isfahan, Iran. He graduated from Azad University.

Playing career
 1973–1974 : playing for Alborz Club-Esfahan
 1975–1976 : Playing for Isfahan Young Adults Representatives
 1977–1978 : Playing for Isfahan Youths Representatives
 1976–1978(3 Years) : Playing for Zob-Ahan Club in Takhte-Jamshid National League in Youths and Adults age group.
 1979–1980 : Playing for Isfahan Bargh Club and winning the Championship Title in Isfahan Province.
 1981–1982 : Playing for Esfahan Pas Club.
 1983–1984 : Playing for Esfahan Gendarmerie (Army) Club and Standing the 1st Provincial Place in Isfahan Province through competition held for selecting the qualified team for the National League.
 1985–1986 : playing for Isfahan Sazman Goosht club and standing the 2nd Provincial in the National cup league
 1982–1984–1985–1986 : Playing for Isfahan Province Adults Representatives, taking part in the National Championship Completions and Ghods League for five years and winning the National Championship Title two times.
 1987–1988 : Playing for Najaf Abad Azad University, winning the Championship Title in the region and the 2nd in the country.
 1988–1989 : Playing for Tehran Sazman Goosht club, winning the 1st title in division 2 league.
 1990–1991 : Playing for Tehran Keshvarz Club, meeting qualification for playing in Iran National League.
 1992–1993 :Playing for Isfahan Zob-Ahan Club, winning the provincial championship title and meeting qualifications for playing in the National League.

Coaching career
 1979–7982 :Head coach of Isfahan pas club for four years
 1979–1982 :Head coach and coach of different age-group provincial representatives in Isfahan during the National Championship Competitions, and winning different titles.
 1983–1984 :Head coach of Isfahan Gandarmerie (army) Club, winning the 1st provincial title held for selecting the qualified teams for the National League.
 1988–1989 : Head coach of Najaf Abad Azad University; winning the 1st title in the region and the 2nd national place held in Mashhad.
 1993–1998:coach of Zob-Ahan (Iran pro league) for five years during National League Of Azadegan
 1998–1999:Head coach of Folad-Mobarakeh (Iran pro league) for one year during the 1st Division League
 1999–2000:Head coach of Zob-Ahan (Iran pro league) Youth Team, winning Provincial Championship
 2001–2004 : Serving well in Isfahan Sepahan (Iran pro league) Club for four years and winning the championship title in the National premier League held in 2001 to 2004; winning championship of the knockoff League 2002–2003
 2004–2005 :Participating in Asia Championship League via Folad-Mobarakeh Sepahan (Iran pro league) Club
 2004–2005 :Head coach of Folad-Mobarakeh Sepahan (Iran pro league) Club
 2005–2006:Coach of Peyakan (Iran pro league) Club
 2006–2007:Coach of Peyakan (Iran pro league) Club
 2009–2010 : Head coach of Aboo-Moslem club 
 2010–2011 head coach of Hamyari (Shahr Dari Arak) 1st division.
 2013–2013 Director coaches of BYSC corona united soccer club in California-USA

Coaching Qualification
 A specific course for young adults and youths in Tehran supervised by the Football Federation
 participation in Football Physiology Exercise Workshop (by Thomas Reilly in 2000)
 Holding class B Certificate from Asia Football Confederation
 Holding Futtor Certificate (Dr Hesham Montaser -FIFA Instructor from Switzerland)
 Holding an Advanced Football Coaching Certificate (by Billt Bingham from England, FIFA Instructor)
 Holding an Advanced Football Coaching Certificate (by Philip Ridden from France, FIFA Instructor)
 Holding an Advanced Football Coaching Certificate (by Roteh Muller from Germany)
 Holding an Advanced Certificate (A) from the Asia Football Confederation (by Reinhard Schom from Germany)
 Holding the Footsal Coaching Certificate (by Khaviar Louzano from Spain)
 Holding the Footsal Coaching Certificate (by Victor Hermanse - coach of the Netherlands)
 Holding the pro license (professional football coach license) by Asian football confederation-instructor of FIFA: Roteh Muller from Germany 2008. and he is a soccer hall of famer.

As an instructor (1997–2000)
 Teaching specific courses for different age groups in Isfahan
 Teaching Class B and C coaching courses in Isfahan and Keraman
 Teaching Class D in Isfahan
 Teaching Class C in Isfahan for three times
 Teaching Class C in Kerman once
 Teaching Class C in Yazd once
 Teaching assistant of Class A in Isfahan ran by Reinhard Fabich from Germany
Participating in specious courses designed for instructors of Asia Football Federation and Confederation

References

1959 births
Living people
Iranian footballers
Sportspeople from Isfahan
Association footballers not categorized by position
Iranian football managers